Chenjerai Dube (born 18 December 1976) is a retired Zimbabwean football goalkeeper. A Zimbabwe international, he played at the 2001 COSAFA Cup.

References 

1976 births
Living people
Zimbabwean footballers
Zimbabwe international footballers
Association football goalkeepers
Zimbabwean expatriate footballers
Expatriate footballers in Botswana
Zimbabwean expatriate sportspeople in Botswana
Highlanders F.C. players
Gilport Lions F.C. players
Uniao Flamengo Santos F.C. players
Hwange Colliery F.C. players